Solus may refer to:

Solus or Soluntum, an ancient city of Sicily
Solus (comics), an American comic book series
Solus (operating system), an operating system based on the Linux kernel
Solus (moth), a genus of moths in the family Saturniidae
Solus (typeface), a serif typeface